Jose Mercau is a former Catholic priest of Argentina who was excommunicated by Pope Francis in 2014.

See also
Catholic Church sexual abuse cases

References

21st-century Argentine Roman Catholic priests
People excommunicated by the Catholic Church
Clergy removed from office